Constantinos Gus Kasapis (born March 18, 1942) was a Canadian football player who played for the BC Lions, Edmonton Eskimos and Calgary Stampeders. He won the Grey Cup with the Lions in 1964. He played college football at the University of Iowa.

References

https://www.newspapers.com/clip/13529373/quad-city-times/
https://www.newspapers.com/clip/13529332/the-indianapolis-news/
https://www.newspapers.com/clip/13529511/the-des-moines-register/
https://www.newspapers.com/clip/13529402/quad-city-times/

1942 births
Living people
American players of Canadian football
Iowa Hawkeyes football players
BC Lions players
Calgary Stampeders players
Edmonton Elks players
Players of American football from Detroit